Harlow Wilcox (January 28, 1943 – August 26, 2002) was an American session musician from Norman, Oklahoma. In 1969 he released the instrumental single "Groovy Grubworm" on Plantation Records (as Harlow Wilcox and the Oakies), which hit No. 30 on the U.S. Billboard Hot 100 chart late that year. Two albums followed. "Groovy Grubworm" has sold over a million copies and was nominated for a Grammy in 1969. On August 26, 2002 Wilcox died from a heart attack at his home in Oklahoma City.

Discography

Albums

Singles

References

Musicians from Norman, Oklahoma
American session musicians
American country guitarists
American male guitarists
American country singer-songwriters
1943 births
2002 deaths
20th-century American singers
20th-century American guitarists
Singer-songwriters from Oklahoma
Guitarists from Oklahoma
Country musicians from Oklahoma
20th-century American male musicians
American male singer-songwriters